Bela hispidula is an extinct species of sea snail, a marine gastropod mollusk in the family Mangeliidae.

Description

Distribution
This extinct marine species was found in Pleistocene strata in Italy.

References

 Harmer, F. W. "IV. The Stratigraphical Position of the Coralline Crag." Geological Magazine 5.9 (1918): 409-412.

External links
  Della Bella G., Naldi F. & Scarponi D. (2015). Molluschi marini del Plio-Pleistocene dell'Emilia-Romagna e della Toscana - Superfamiglia Conoidea, vol. 4, Mangeliidae II. Lavori della Società Italiana di Malacologia. 26: 1-80
 

hispidula